This list of Vogue Greece cover models is a catalog of cover models who have appeared on the cover of Vogue Greece, the Greek edition of Vogue magazine.

Vogue Hellas (2000-2012)

2000

2001

2002

2003

2004

2005

2006

2007

2008

2009

2010

2011

2012

Vogue Greece (2019-present)

2019

2020

2021

2022

External links
Vogue Greece Official Site

Greece
Greek entertainment-related lists
Greek fashion